Le Diable boiteux (French for The Lame Devil) may refer to:

As a French work
 Le Diable boiteux (novel), 1707 novel by Alain-René Lesage
 Le Diable boiteux (play), 1707 comedy by Florent Carton Dancourt
 Le Diable boiteux (opera), 1782 opéra comique by Charles Nicolas Favart
 Le Diable boiteux (ballet), 1836 ballet by Jean Coralli
 Le Diable boiteux (film), 1948 film by Sacha Guitry

As a historical nickname
 Asmodeus, a demon king
 Talleyrand (1754–1838), French diplomat
 Eliaser Bamberg (1760-1833), Dutch stage magician
 Lord Byron (1788–1824), English poet

See also
 The Lame Devil (disambiguation), items under the translated English title